Gino Guyer (born October 14, 1983, in Coleraine, Minnesota) is an American professional ice hockey centre.

Draft 
Guyer was drafted 165th overall by the Dallas Stars in the 2003 NHL Entry Draft. To date, he has yet to play in the National Hockey League.

Career

Early career 
After a standout career at Greenway High School, in which he was awarded the 2002 Minnesota Mr. Hockey award as the state's most outstanding high school player, Guyer was recruited by the University of Minnesota. He supplemented his development by playing a total of 20 games with the Lincoln Stars of the USHL, tallying a total of 9 goals and 12 assists in two seasons of play.

In 2003, as a freshman with the Gophers, Guyer scored 29 points; the most notable of which forced overtime in the NCAA National Semifinal against the University of Michigan. Ultimately, the Gophers would advance to the Division I National Championship, defeating the University of New Hampshire 5–1 in regulation, earning the program's 5th NCAA title.

Guyer would go on to captain the Golden Gophers in his senior year (2006). Though Guyer would tally only 14 points through 41 games, Minnesota went on to win the MacNaughton Cup, for their first outright WCHA title since 1992.

In 2006, he had a brief spell in the AHL team Philadelphia Phantoms, as well as in the ECHL teams Texas Wildcatters and Alaska Aces.

He then played two seasons for the Phoenix RoadRunners, and a single season for Bakersfield Condors.

Career statistics

Regular season and playoffs

International

References

External links

1983 births
Living people
Alaska Aces (ECHL) players
American men's ice hockey centers
Bakersfield Condors (1998–2015) players
Ice hockey players from Minnesota
Lincoln Stars players
People from Coleraine, Minnesota
Philadelphia Phantoms players
Phoenix RoadRunners players
University of Minnesota alumni
Dallas Stars draft picks
Minnesota Golden Gophers men's ice hockey players
Texas Wildcatters players
NCAA men's ice hockey national champions